"Ich will nicht dein Leben" is a German schlager song by singer Thomas Anders. It was Anders' fourth single.

Track listing
Hansa 104 591-100 7"
 "Ich Will Nicht Dein Leben" (Axel Breitung / Michael Kunze / Uwe Busse) - 3:38
 "Ich Hatte Mal Freunde" (Axel Breitung / René Marcard / Uwe Busse) - 3:37

References

1982 singles
Thomas Anders songs
Hansa Records singles
Songs written by Axel Breitung
1982 songs